Harawi can mean:

Harawi (genre), a traditional genre of music and poetry of indigenous peoples of the Andes
Harawi (Messiaen), a song cycle by Olivier Messiaen for soprano and piano
Abolfadl Harawi, a 10th-century astronomer from Ray, Iran/Persia
Muhammad ibn Yusuf al-Harawi, a late 15th-century physician from Herat, Persia, now part of Afghanistan
Nimat Allah al-Harawi (fl. 1613–1630) a historian of Afghanistan and Mughal Emperor Jehangir